Qezel Yataq (also Romanized as Qezel Yātāq; also known as Kyzyl-Yatag and Qizil Yatāgh) is a village in Garmeh-ye Shomali Rural District, Kandovan District, Mianeh County, East Azerbaijan Province, Iran. At the 2006 census, its population was 136, in 27 families.

References 

Tageo

Populated places in Meyaneh County